Robert E. "Bob" Vanasek (born April 2, 1949) is a Minnesota politician and a former member and Speaker of the Minnesota House of Representatives. A Democrat, he was first elected to the House in 1972 at just 23 years of age, and was re-elected every two years from 1974 to 1990. He represented the old districts 24A and 25A, which included portions of Dakota, Le Sueur, Rice and Scott counties in the southeastern part of the state.

Education background
Vanasek graduated from New Prague High School in New Prague, and received a B.A. in political science from the University of Minnesota. He went on to receive his M.A. in public administration from the John F. Kennedy School of Government at Harvard University in 1985 through a Bush Foundation Fellowship. He also attended William Mitchell College of Law in Saint Paul.

Legislative and professional leadership
While in the legislature, Vanasek served as chair of the House Criminal Justice and Judiciary committees, the  Rules and Legislative Administration Committee, and the Ways and Means Committee. He was an assistant majority leader from 1979–1985, and, briefly, majority leader in 1987.

Vanasek became Speaker in 1987, after the resignation of Fred Norton, who was appointed to the  Minnesota Court of Appeals by Governor Rudy Perpich. He served as Speaker until 1992, when he left the legislature to become executive director of the Minnesota High Technology Council, a private organization, until 1995. He was vice president of public affairs at Metropolitan State University from 1995–1999.

Vanasek has run Robert Vanasek & Associates since 1999, and is currently a lobbyist for a variety of organizations. He is also a member of the board of directors of Minnesota's Private Colleges.

Honorary consul of the Czech Republic
Vanasek was installed as the new honorary consul of the Czech Republic for the four-state area of Minnesota, Iowa, North Dakota and South Dakota on September 19, 2009, by Czech Ambassador Petr Kolar. The Czech Republic maintains 14 consulates in the United States, and 166 worldwide. The Czech honorary consulate joins some 30 other such honorary and official consulates with jurisdiction in the state of Minnesota.

References

External links

"Vanasek installed as honorary consul of the Czech Republic" 9/11/2008

Living people
1943 births
Speakers of the Minnesota House of Representatives
Democratic Party members of the Minnesota House of Representatives
American people of Czech descent
Harvard Kennedy School alumni
University of Minnesota College of Liberal Arts alumni
William Mitchell College of Law alumni
People from New Prague, Minnesota